Events from the 1470s in Denmark.

Incumbents
 Monarch – Christian I
 Steward of the Realm – Erik Ottesen Rosenkrantz

Events

1471
 10 October  The Battle of Brunkeberg.

1474
 April  Christian I visits Milan and Rome.
 Christian I visits Burgundy.

 1475
 30 September  Christian I issues a royal order that farmers are only allowed to trade with citizens from market towns. People in the countryside are only allowed to buy products for their own use.

1479
 1 June – University of Copenhagen is inaugurated by King Christian I.

Births
 c. 1470 – Mogens Gøye, statesman (died 1544)
 7 October 1471 – Frederick I of Denmark, King of Denmark and Norway (died 1533)
 1473 – Otte Krumpen, Marshal (died 1569)

Deaths

Full date missing
 Tetz Rosengaard. arch dean and Royal Chancellor (born unknown)

References

1470s in Denmark